Perumbavoor has many Hindu temples, Muslim mosques and Christian churches.  As the area is dominated by expatriate north Indian workers, some places of worship cater to the taste of North Indian devotees.

Masjids
Perumbavoor-Aluva-Kothamangalam-Muvattupuzha region is a main centre for Mappila Muslims. Unlike southern districts of Kerala, Mappila Muslims make up most of the Muslim population. Thulukkar, the Hanafi school of Islam followers are majority in southern parts of Kerala. There are some pockets of Hanafi Muslims around Perumbavur also. Muslims include Sunni and Ahmediyya factions. Towns of Perumbavoor, Aluva, Kothamangalam and Muvattupuzha have a strong Mappila Muslim community which also spreads through the villages around these towns.

South Vallam Juma-masjid. Is the first mosque in Ernakulam District about 900 years old
 Perumbavoor Town Juma-masjid - Perumbavoor Central Mosque
 Meca Masjid, A.M Road perumbavoor
 Madina Masjid, Near Pvt bus stand perumbavoor
 Vallam Rayonpuram Juma-masjid, perumbavoor
Vallam Junction Juma-masjid, (SH) airport road
 Taqwa Masjid, A.M Road perumbavoor
 Akashwani Masjid, Near Pathipalam, Perumbavoor
 Allapra Juma-masjid. (2.3 km)
 Parappuram Juma Masjid Vallam parappuram, Perumabavoor
 Kandanthara Juma Masjid, perumabvoor, Kandanthara is the largest populated Muslim Jamaath in Ernakulam district.
 Town Masjid Near K.S.R.T.C Bus stand Perumbavoor
 Juma Masjid Mudickal (3.5 km) The second largest Masjid in Kerala.
Pallipram Padinjare Muslim Jama'ath PuthanPalli, West Mudickal (4 km)
 Central Masjid, Manjapetty (5 km)
 Vengola Juma-masjid (4.3 km)
 Thandekkad Juma-masjid (4 km) 
 Kanjirakkad Juma-masjid (2.7 km)
 Arackapady Juma-masjid, Perumbavoor
 Onnam mile masjid. (.5 km)
 Odakaly Juma-masjid, Perumbavoor-Kothamangalam route.
 Ponjassery Masjid, Perumbavoor-Aluva route.
 Pallikavala Juma-masjid, Pallikavala Perumbavoor
 Pallippady Masjid, Perumbavoor-Aluva route.
 Nedumthodu Masjid, Perumbavoor-Aluva route.
 Mouloodpura Masjid, Perumbavoor-Aluva route.
Cheruvelikkunnu Muslim jamaath and nibrasul Islam madrassa
Chembarathukunnu Muslim jamaath
kuthirapparambu Muslim jamaath
kanamparambu Muslim jamaath

Temples

 Iringole Kavu, Perumbavoor.
 Chelathu Kavu Bhadrakali temple
 Pirakkad sreemahadheva temple, Arackapady
Perumbavoor Sri Dharmasastha Temple
Koottumadom Sree Subramanya Swami Temple, Rayamangalam.
moorukavu bhagavathi temple, rayamangalam
Perakkattu Sree Mahadeva Temple, Rayamangalam.
Chelamattom Temple
Alppara kavu
Iringol kavu which is the largest Kavu in Kerala.
Aimury Temple
Thottuva Dhanwanthari temple (8 km from Perumbavoor)
Kuzhippillikavu
 IRAVICHIRA SHIVA TEMPLE
 Kallil Temple
 Keezhillam Mahadeva Temple
 Keezhillam Kaniyasseri Vishnu Temple
 Chakkarakkattu Shri Bhagavathi Temple, Kanjirakkad
 Cheruvallikkavu Bhagavathi Temple, Aimury, Perumbavoor.
 Paalakattuthazham Bhagavathi Temple, Perumbavoor
 Devi Kshethram, Panichayam
 ThoombayiBhagavathi temple, palakkattuthazam.
 Kozhippilakkal bhagavathy kshethram manjappeetty
 Ezhippuram bhagavathy kshethram
 Peeshampilly sree dharma shasthra kshethram cheruvelikkunnu
Sree Vaikkarakkavu Bhagavathi Temple, Vaikkara

Churches
 St. Mary's Immaculate Church, Perumbavoor.
 Evangelistic Association Of The East under Jacobite Syriac Orthodox Church.
 St. Antony's Church, Kodanad (10 km)
 St. Theresa of Ávila Forane Church, Vallam
 San Thome Malankara Catholic Church, MC Road, Perumbavoor Town.
 Sharon Fellowship Church Kuruppampady near MGM High School
 St. Jacob's Jacobite Syrian Church, Allapra
 Bethel Sulukko  Orthodox Cathedral, Perumbavoor Town 
 St. Gregorios Orthodox Chapel, Perumbavoor.
 St. Mary's Jacobite Syrian Valiya pally, Thuruthiply
 St. Paul's Marthoma Church is located near Asram High school.
 Brethren church is located in Onnamile which is near Asram High School
 St. Thomas Evangelical Church of India is located near to Iringole Old Post office.
 St. Mary's Jacobite Syrian Cathedral, Kuruppampady is one of the oldest churches in Perumbavoor.
 Kuruppampady St. Thomas Orthodox Catholicate Centre.
 Independent Baptist Church Kuruppampady
 St. Thomas Catholic Church, Pulluvazhy
 CSI, Catholic and Orthodox churches are also there in Perumbavoor
 St. Mary's Catholic Church, MC Road. Perumbavoor Town.
 Sacred Heart Church, Mudickal.
 St. George Latin Catholic Church, MC Road. Perumbavoor.
 Valiyanchirangara St. Peter's and St. Paul's Orthodox church.
 Bethlehem St. Mary's Jacobite Syrian Orthodox Church Alattuchira, Kodanadu
 Kodanadu Mar Malke Orthodox church.

References

Religious buildings and structures in Ernakulam district